Potisangaba panama is a species of beetle in the family Cerambycidae, the only species in the genus Potisangaba.

References

Heteropsini